The Democratic Party is a political party in Tunisia founded on 9 April 2016.

References

2016 establishments in Tunisia
Liberal parties in Tunisia
Political parties established in 2016
Political parties in Tunisia
Secularism in Tunisia